Angelo Caloia (born 2 May 1939) is an Italian economist and banker, who was the President of the Vatican Bank for 20 years until September 2009.

He was sentenced on Thursday, January 21, 2021 to eight years in prison for embezzling money following a real estate transaction.

References

1939 births
Living people
Italian bankers
Vatican City bankers
Università Cattolica del Sacro Cuore alumni
Place of birth missing (living people)